Ricardo Winter was a Surinamese professional football manager.

Career
Since 2010 until 2011 and in 2012 coached the Suriname national football team. Previously, he was a head coach of S.V. Robinhood. He died in 2015 due to health complications.

Personal life
His cousin Aron Winter was also a professional footballer.

References

External links

Profile at Soccerpunter.com

1961 births
2015 deaths
Dutch football managers
Surinamese football managers
SVB Eerste Divisie managers
S.V. Robinhood managers
Suriname national football team managers